Puspa Arumsari (born 10 March 1993) is an Indonesian pencak silat practitioner. She is a gold medalist at the 2016 Pencak Silat World Championship which was coincidentally held in Indonesia. Puspa represented Indonesia at the 2018 Asian Games and claimed gold medal in the women's individual tunggal event where Pencak silat was one of the newest sports to be introduced at the 2018 Asian Games. This became Indonesia's first Asian Games gold medal in its own martial art, pencak silat.

Achievements

References 

1993 births
Living people
Silat practitioners
Indonesian female martial artists
Pencak silat practitioners at the 2018 Asian Games
Asian Games gold medalists for Indonesia
Asian Games medalists in pencak silat
Medalists at the 2018 Asian Games
Competitors at the 2017 Southeast Asian Games
Competitors at the 2019 Southeast Asian Games
Southeast Asian Games gold medalists for Indonesia
Southeast Asian Games bronze medalists for Indonesia
Southeast Asian Games medalists in pencak silat
Southeast Asian Games silver medalists for Indonesia
Competitors at the 2021 Southeast Asian Games
21st-century Indonesian women